San Pietro is a Romanesque architecture, Roman Catholic church in Gemonio, Province of Varese, region of Lombardy, Italy.

History
The stone church has been refurbished and enlarged over the years, but retains some of the early Romanesque elements. It is suspected that the apse dates to a grant in 712 by King Liutprand for the refurbishment of a chapel. The original church had a single nave with small windows. The tall belltower was added in 1010–1020. The second nave was likely added in the 11th-century. , but the third not till the 15th century.

References

Churches in Lombardy
11th-century Roman Catholic church buildings in Italy
Romanesque architecture in Lombardy